Liévin Lerno (3 October 1927 – March 2017) was a Belgian cyclist. He was born in Lokeren, East Flanders. He competed in the individual and team road race events at the 1948 Summer Olympics, winning a gold medal in the team event.

References

External links
 

1927 births
2017 deaths
People from Lokeren
Belgian male cyclists
Cyclists at the 1948 Summer Olympics
Olympic cyclists of Belgium
Cyclists from East Flanders